Brigadier General (retired) Russell D. Howard is an American veteran Special Forces officer, academic, tutor, writer and counter-terrorism strategist.

Howard is adjunct professor and director of the Monterey Terrorism Research and Education Program (MonTREP) at the Middlebury Institute of International Studies.

Military career
General Howard served as an "A" Team commander in the 7th Special Forces Group from 1970 to 1972. He left the active component and then served in the United States Army Reserve from 1972 to 1980. During this period he served as an overseas manager, American International Underwriters, Melbourne, Australia, and China tour manager and Canadian Pacific Airlines. He was recalled to active duty in 1980, and served initially in Korea as an infantry company commander. Subsequent assignments included classified project officer, U.S. Army 1st Special Operations Command, at Fort Bragg, and operations officer and company commander, 1st Battalion, 1st Special Forces Group in Okinawa, Japan.

Howard was head of the Department of Social Sciences and the founding director of the Combating Terrorism Center at West Point. His previous positions include deputy department head of the Department of Social Sciences, Army Chief of Staff Fellow at the Center for International Affairs at Harvard University, and commander of the 1st Special Forces Group (Airborne) at Fort Lewis, Washington. Other recent assignments include assistant to the special representative to the secretary general during UNOSOM II in Somalia, deputy chief of staff for I Corps, and chief of staff and deputy commander for the Combined Joint Task Force, Haiti/Haitian Advisory Group. Previously, Howard was commander of 3d Battalion, 1st Special Warfare Training Group (Airborne) at Fort Bragg, North Carolina. He served as the Administrative Assistant to Admiral Stansfield Turner and as a special assistant to the commander of United States Southern Command. Howard was the founding director of the Jebsen Center for Counter-Terrorism Studies at The Fletcher School, before leaving in September 2008. Presently, Howard is a senior fellow at Joint Special Operations University and an adjunct professor at The Middlebury Institute of International Studies at Monterey.

Books and publications
Terrorism and Counterterrorism: Understanding the New Security Environment, Readings and Interpretations, (2003) Revised & Updated 2008, 3/e by  Russell D. Howard, Reid L. Sawyer and Natasha Bajema
Defeating Terrorism: by Russell D. Howard, Reid L. Sawyer
Homeland Security and Terrorism (2005) Russell D. Howard, James Forest, Joanne Moore
Terrorism and Weapons of Mass Destruction. Russell D. Howard and James J.F. Forest (Eds). With Natasha E. Bajema
Intelligence in Denied Areas: Russell D. Howard
 Northeast Asia Regional Security and the United States Military: Context, Presence, and Roles By Susan F. Bryant, Russell D. Howard, Jay M. Parker, and Albert S. Wilner, INSS Occasional Paper 47, November 2002, USAF Institute for National Security Studies, USAF Academy, Colorado
 The Chinese People's Liberation Army: "Short Arms and Slow Legs" by Russell D. Howard, INSS Occasional Paper 28, Regional Security Series, September 1999, USAF Institute for National Security Studies, USAF Academy, Colorado
 Thinking Creatively in the War on Terrorism – Leveraging NATO and the Partnership for Peace Consortium. By Russell D. Howard

References

External links
 Middlebury Institute of International Studies Faculty

Year of birth missing (living people)
Living people
Harvard University people
Members of the United States Army Special Forces
United States Army generals
American non-fiction writers
Recipients of the Distinguished Service Medal (US Army)
Recipients of the Legion of Merit
American male non-fiction writers